The Gargaú River is a Brazilian river that bathes the coast of the state of Paraíba. Located in the region of Várzea Paraibana, important events in the history of Paraíba took place on its banks, especially during the sugar cane cycle in Brazil, the time of Colonial Brazil.

References 

Rivers of Paraíba
CS1 maint: multiple names: authors list